RoqueForte is a 2010 studio album by Flemish acoustic avant-rock, experimental and neo-classical chamber music group Aranis, led by composer and contrabass player Joris Vanvinckenroye. It is their fourth album and was released in Belgium by Home Records.

The album includes guest musicians Dave Kerman (drums) from Thinking Plague and Present, and Pierre Chevalier (keyboards) from Univers Zero and Present. The inclusion of a drummer on RoqueForte is a departure from Aranis' previous "signature drummerless acoustic sound".

Reception

In a review at AllMusic, Dave Lynch called RoqueForte Aranis' "finest recording thus far", and described the music as their "most varied … to date". He said that Joris Vanvinckenroye's compositions here are "uniquely beautiful and powerful", and complimented rock drummer Dave Kerman's restraint on this "chamberesque – and at times nearly orchestral" album.

Writing at Progressor, Vitaly Menshikov described the album as "truly astonishing", and "highly recommended to all 'serious' progressive music lovers". A reviewer in The Rocktologist magazine was a little more critical of the album, saying that while he has enjoyed Aranis' music, he felt that some of the compositions on RoqueForte tend to be similar in structure to their earlier work, and that the arrangements are often a little "too condensed", leaving "hardly any spaces for the music to take on more atmosphere".

Track listing

Source: Liner notes, AllMusic, Discogs.

Personnel
Joris Vanvinckenroye – composer, double bass
Jana Arns – flutes
Liesbeth Lambrecht – violin
Stefan Wellens – viola
Marjolein Cools – accordion
Pierre Chevalier – piano
Stijn Denys – guitar
Dave Kerman – drums, percussion
Source: Liner notes, AllMusic, Discogs.

Recording notes
Recorded March–April 2010 at Madam Fortuna, Borgerhout, Antwerp, Belgium
Pieter Thys – engineer
Flavio Marredda – mastering, mixing
Joris En Jana – mastering, mixing
Liesbeth Lambrecht – layout
Iris Thissen – photography
Source: Liner notes, AllMusic, Discogs.

References

External links
RoqueForte at Home Records

2010 albums
Aranis albums